David Eagleman (born April 25, 1971)  is an American neuroscientist, author, and science communicator. He teaches neuroscience at Stanford University and is CEO and co-founder of Neosensory, a company that develops devices for sensory substitution. He also directs the non-profit Center for Science and Law, which seeks to align the legal system with modern neuroscience and is Chief Science Officer and co-founder of BrainCheck, a digital cognitive health platform used in medical practices and health systems. He is known for his work on brain plasticity, time perception, synesthesia, and neurolaw.

He is a Guggenheim Fellow and a New York Times-bestselling author published in 32 languages. He is the writer and presenter of the Emmy-nominated international television series, The Brain with David Eagleman.

Biography
Eagleman was born in New Mexico to Arthur and Cirel Egelman, a Jewish physician and biology teacher, respectively. Eagleman decided to change his name from Egelman after discovering alternative spellings in personal genealogy research. An early experience of falling from a roof raised his interest in understanding the neural basis of time perception. He attended the Albuquerque Academy for high school. As an undergraduate at Rice University, he majored in British and American literature. He spent his junior year abroad at Oxford University. He graduated from Rice in 1993. He earned his PhD in Neuroscience at Baylor College of Medicine in 1998, followed by a postdoctoral fellowship at the Salk Institute.

Eagleman is currently an adjunct professor at Stanford University, after directing a neuroscience research laboratory for 10 years at Baylor College of Medicine. He serves as the Chief Science Advisor for the Mind Science Foundation, and is the youngest member of the board of directors of the Long Now Foundation. Eagleman is a Guggenheim Fellow, a Fellow of the Institute for Ethics and Emerging Technologies, and a council member on the World Economic Forum's Global Agenda Council on Neuroscience & Behavior. He was voted one of Houston's Most Stylish men, and Italy's Style fashion magazine named Eagleman one of the "Brainiest, Brightest Idea Guys" and featured him on the cover. He was awarded the Science Educator Award by the Society for Neuroscience. He has spun off several companies from his research, including BrainCheck, which helps medical professionals assess and diagnose cognitive impairment and dementia, and Neosensory, which uses sound-to-touch sensory substitution to feed data streams into the brain, as described in his TED talk.

Eagleman has been profiled in magazines such as the New Yorker, Texas Monthly, and Texas Observer, on pop-culture television programs such as The Colbert Report and on the scientific program Nova Science Now. Stewart Brand wrote that "David Eagleman may be the best combination of scientist and fiction-writer alive". Eagleman founded Deathswitch, an internet based dead man's switch service, in 2007. He also appeared on MPR News, in a segment called Ask a Neuroscientist, where he answered audience-submitted questions.

As opposed to committing to strict atheism or to a particular religious position, Eagleman who was raised Jewish, refers to himself as a possibilian, which distinguishes itself from atheism and agnosticism by studying the structure of the possibility space.

Scientific specializations

Sensory substitution
Sensory substitution refers to feeding information into the brain via unusual sensory channels (for example, audition through vibrations on the skin). In a TED talk, Eagleman unveiled a method for using sound-to-touch sensory substitution to feed data streams into the brain. Eagleman started research of sensory substitutions for the deaf in 2013. In 2015, together with Dr. Scott Novich, PhD, he co-founded the company Neosensory, headquartered in Palo Alto, California, and of which he is the CEO. As of 2020, Neosensory has raised 16 million dollars in venture funding. Eagleman's book Livewired describes the history and future of sensory substitution. In 2015, the company presented the Versatile Extra-Sensory Transducer (VEST) wearable device that "translates" speech and other audio signals into series of vibration, that allows deaf people to "feel" sounds on their body. In 2019, Neosensory presented the Buzz wristband, a sensory substitution device that transfers sound into dynamic vibration patterns, aimed for deaf or hard-of-hearing individuals.

Time perception
Eagleman's scientific work combines psychophysical, behavioral, and computational approaches to address the relationship between the timing of perception and the timing of neural signals. Areas for which he is known include temporal encoding, time warping, manipulations of the perception of causality, and time perception in high-adrenaline situations. In one experiment, he dropped himself and other volunteers from a 150-foot tower to measure time perception as they fell. He writes that his long-range goal is "to understand how neural signals processed by different brain regions come together for a temporally unified picture of the world".

Synesthesia
Synesthesia is an unusual perceptual condition in which stimulation to one sense triggers an involuntary sensation in other senses. Eagleman is the developer of The Synesthesia Battery, a free online test by which people can determine whether they are synesthetic. By this technique he has tested and analyzed thousands of synesthetes, and has written a book on synesthesia with Richard Cytowic, entitled Wednesday is Indigo Blue: Discovering the Brain of Synesthesia. Eagleman has proposed that sensory processing disorder, a common characteristic of autism, may be a form of synesthesia.

Visual illusions
Eagleman has published extensively on what visual illusions tell us about neurobiology, concentrating especially on the flash lag illusion and wagon wheel effect.

Neuroscience and the law
Neurolaw is an emerging field that determines how modern brain science should affect the way we make laws, punish criminals, and invent new methods for rehabilitation. Eagleman is the founder and director of the Center for Science and Law.

Memory 
Eagleman's BrainCheck tests ones cognitive abilities, including their memory. The Eagleman Laboratory operated a website from 2013 to 2017 called mylifememory.info about hyperthymesia, which invited users to take "The Extraordinary Memory Test" for research purposes. The lab was trying to find individuals with the condition so they could "further elucidate the causes and nature of hyperthymesia."

Television
Eagleman wrote and hosted The Brain with David Eagleman, an international television documentary series for which he was the writer, host, and executive producer  The series debuted on PBS in America in 2015, followed by the BBC in the United Kingdom and the SBS in Australia before worldwide distribution. The New York Times listed it as one of the best television shows of the year. In 2016, the series was nominated for an Emmy Award.

In 2018 he made a Netflix documentary, The Creative Brain, based on his book The Runaway Species with Anthony Brandt. In that documentary, he interviews creators such as Tim Robbins, Michael Chabon, Grimes, Dan Weiss, Kelis, Robert Glasper, Nathan Myhrvold, Michelle Khine, Nick Cave, Bjarke Ingels, and others.

Eagleman serves as the scientific advisor for the HBO television series Westworld. He previously served as the science advisor for the TNT television drama, Perception, starring Eric McCormack as a schizophrenic neuropsychiatrist. In that role, Eagleman wrote one of the episodes, "Eternity".

In 2021, Eagleman was the guest interviewee on The Life Scientific on BBC Radio 4 discussing his life and science.

Books

Wednesday is Indigo Blue: Discovering the Brain of Synesthesia
Eagleman's book on synesthesia, co-authored with neurologist Richard E. Cytowic, compiles the modern understanding and research about this perceptual condition. The afterword for the book was written by Dmitri Nabokov, the son of Vladimir Nabokov, a famous synesthete. The book won the Montaigne Medal for "books that illuminate, progress, or redirect thought".

Sum
Eagleman's work of literary fiction, Sum: Forty Tales from the Afterlives, is an international bestseller published in 32 languages. The Observer wrote that "Sum has the unaccountable, jaw-dropping quality of genius", The Wall Street Journal called Sum "inventive and imaginative", and the Los Angeles Times hailed the book as "teeming, writhing with imagination". In The New York Times Book Review, Alexander McCall Smith described Sum as a "delightful, thought-provoking little collection belonging to that category of strange, unclassifiable books that will haunt the reader long after the last page has been turned. It is full of tangential insights into the human condition and poetic thought experiments ... It is also full of touching moments and glorious wit of the sort one only hopes will be in copious supply on the other side." Sum was chosen by Time magazine for their Summer Reading list, and selected as Book of the Week by both The Guardian and The Week. In September 2009, Sum was ranked by Amazon as the #2 bestselling book in the United Kingdom. Sum was named a Book of the Year by Barnes and Noble, The Chicago Tribune, The Guardian, and The Scotsman.

The Safety Net (previously titled Why the Net Matters)
In 2020, Eagleman published The Safety Net: Surviving Pandemics and Other Disasters, an updated and re-titled version of a book he had published in 2010: Why the Net Matters (Canongate Books). in the book, he argues that the advent of the internet mitigates some of the traditional existential threats to civilizations. In keeping with the book's theme of the dematerialization of physical goods, he chose to publish the manuscript as an app for the iPad rather than a physical book. The New York Times Magazine described Why the Net Matters as a "superbook", referring to "books with so much functionality that they're sold as apps". Stewart Brand described Why the Net Matters as a "breakthrough work". The project was longlisted for the 2011 Publishing Innovation Award by Digital Book World. Eagleman's talk on the topic, entitled "Six Easy Ways to Avert the Collapse of Civilization", was voted the #8 Technology talk of 2010 by Fora.tv.

Incognito: The Secret Lives of the Brain
Eagleman's science book Incognito: The Secret Lives of the Brain is a New York Times bestseller and was named a Best Book of the Year by Amazon, the Boston Globe, and the Houston Chronicle. Incognito was reviewed as "appealing and persuasive" by The Wall Street Journal and "a shining example of lucid and easy-to-grasp science writing" by The Independent. The book explores the brain as being a "team of rivals", with parts of the brain constantly "fighting it out" among each other.

The Brain: The Story of You
In 2015, The Brain came out as a companion book to the television series The Brain with David Eagleman.

Brain and Behavior: A Cognitive Neuroscience Perspective
In 2016, Eagleman co-authored this Cognitive Neuroscience textbook with Jonathan Downar. The textbook is published by Oxford University Press, and is used by many universities around the world, including Stanford and Columbia.

The Runaway Species
In 2017 Eagleman and co-author Anthony Brandt (a music composer) wrote The Runaway Species, an examination of human creativity. The book was described by the journal Nature as "A lively exploration of the software our brains run in search of the mother lode of invention… It sweeps the reader through examples from engineering, science, product design, music and the visual arts to trace the roots of creative thinking." The Wall Street Journal wrote that "the authors look at art and science together to examine how innovations — from Picasso's initially offensive paintings to Steve Jobs's startling iPhone — build on what already exists ... This manifesto of sorts shows how both disciplines foster creativity."

Livewired: The Inside Story of the Ever-Changing Brain
In 2020, Eagleman published Livewired: The Inside Story of the Ever-Changing Brain, a nonfiction book about neuroplasticity. As of late 2020, it is nominated for the Pulitzer Prize. A Kirkus review described the book as "outstanding popular science", while New Scientist magazine wrote that "Eagleman brings the subject to life in a way I haven't seen other writers achieve before." Harvard Business Review wrote that Livewired "gets the science right and makes it accessible ... completely upending our basic sense of what the brain is in the process." The Wall Street Journal wrote that "since the passing of Isaac Asimov, we haven't had a working scientist like Eagleman, who engages his ideas in such a variety of modes. Livewired reads wonderfully, like what a book would be if it were written by Oliver Sacks and William Gibson, sitting on Carl Sagan's front lawn."

Works
 Wednesday Is Indigo Blue: Discovering the Brain of Synesthesia, co-authored with Richard Cytowic, MIT Press, 2009
 Sum: Forty Tales from the Afterlives, Pantheon, 2009 (Fiction)
 The Safety Net: Surviving Pandemics and Other Disasters, Canongate, 2020 (originally published as Why the Net Matters, Canongate, 2010)
 Incognito: The Secret Lives of the Brain, Pantheon, 2011
 The Brain with David Eagleman, a PBS television series, 2015
 The Brain: The Story of You, Canongate, 2015
 Brain and Behavior: A Cognitive Neuroscience Perspective, co-authored with Jonathan Downar, Oxford University Press, 2016
 The Runaway Species, co-authored with Anthony Brandt, Catapult, 2017
 Livewired: The Inside Story of the Ever-Changing Brain, Penguin Random House, 2020

References

External links

 
 David Eagleman's Stanford website
 PBS series: The Brain with David Eagleman
 
 "Can we create new senses for humans?" (TED2015)

1971 births
Living people
American neuroscientists
Jewish American scientists
American science writers
21st-century American short story writers
Rice University alumni
Stanford University faculty
Scientists from New Mexico
Writers from Albuquerque, New Mexico
21st-century American scientists
21st-century American non-fiction writers
21st-century American Jews
Baylor College of Medicine alumni
Baylor College of Medicine faculty